Mark William Ogilvie Birdwood, 3rd Baron Birdwood (23 November 1938 – 11 July 2015) was a British peer and politician.

Biography
Birdwood was the son of Christopher Birdwood, 2nd Baron Birdwood, and Elizabeth Vere Drummond Ogilvie. He attended Radley College in Oxfordshire.

Birdwood served with the Royal Horse Guards and reached the rank of Second Lieutenant. He attended Trinity College, Cambridge, where he graduated with a Master of Arts (MA). Birdwood held leadership positions in several industrial companies. Between 1970 and 1986 he worked as director of Wrightson Wood. In 1986 he was as a business owner and president of Martlet Ltd. From 1989 to 1992 he served as Director of Scientific Generics. He was chairman of Worthington & Company from 1994 to 1998. In 2001, he was chairman of Steel Tower Ltd.

On 6 January 1962 he inherited his father's title. Between 1965 and 1999 he participated several times in debates in the House of Lords. Until 11 November 1999, he was sitting in the upper house, then he lost his seat by the House of Lords Act 1999.

Personal life
Birdwood married, on 27 April 1963, Judith Helen Roberts, eldest daughter of  Reginald Gordon Seymour Roberts, of Newton Aycliffe, County  Durham. They had one daughter born on 29 July 1964, Sophie Frederika Birdwood, who married Simon Frederick Marquis, 3rd Earl of Woolton in 1987 and had three daughters before divorcing in 1997. On the death of the 3rd Baron without male issue in 2015, the Birdwood barony and baronetcy became extinct.

Coat of arms

References

1938 births
2015 deaths
3
British people of Scottish descent
People educated at Radley College
Alumni of Trinity College, Cambridge
Conservative Party (UK) hereditary peers
Birdwood